Baton Rouge Raceway located in Baker, Louisiana is a 3/8 mile dirt oval race track. It is the home track of the  O'Reilly SUPR racing series. In 2007 the hosted a combined race of World of Outlaws Late Model Series and O'Reilly SUPR Late Model Series, the event was won by Chris Madden.

External links
Official Website

Buildings and structures in East Baton Rouge Parish, Louisiana
Sports venues in Baton Rouge, Louisiana
Dirt oval race tracks in the United States
Motorsport venues in Louisiana
Tourist attractions in East Baton Rouge Parish, Louisiana
Sports in East Baton Rouge Parish, Louisiana